Everclear is a brand name of rectified spirit (also known as grain alcohol and neutral spirit) produced by the American company Luxco (formerly known as the David Sherman Corporation). It is made from grain and is bottled at 60%, 75.5%, 94.5% and 95% alcohol by volume (120, 151, 189, and 190 U.S. proof respectively). Due to its market prevalence and high alcohol content, the product has become iconic with a "notorious reputation" in popular culture. Sale of the 190-proof variant is prohibited in some states, which led Luxco to start selling the 189-proof version.

Consumption
According to the manufacturer, Everclear "should be viewed as an unfinished ingredient", not consumed directly in undiluted form, and the company acknowledges that the product "has a rather notorious reputation" due to its high alcohol content. Rather than consuming Everclear directly, the company says it should be diluted by mixing it with water or other ingredients until the alcohol strength of the drink is "no more dangerous than other spirits or liqueurs on the shelf". For example, ordinary vodka, gin, rum and tequila have an alcohol concentration typically around 40% alcohol by volume (80 proof), and liqueurs are typically around 20% alcohol (40 proof).

Everclear is also used as a household "food-grade" cleaning, disinfecting, or stove fuel alcohol because its fumes and odor are less offensive than isopropyl, rubbing, and denatured alcohol which are toxic to breathe or drink. Everclear is also used for extracting flavor from other ingredients to make infusions and tinctures because of its neutral flavor profile.

Similar brands
Luxco also manufactures two other brands, Golden Grain alcohol and Crystal Clear alcohol, as essentially the same spirit with a different brand name. Several other brands of grain neutral spirits are also available on the market from other companies.

Alcohol content

Ethanol cannot be concentrated by ordinary distillation to greater than 97.2% by volume (95.6% by weight), because at that concentration, the vapor has the same ratio of water to alcohol as the liquid, a phenomenon known as azeotropy. The 190-proof variant of Everclear is 92.4% ethanol by weight and is thus produced at approximately the practical limit of distillation purity.

Some U.S. states impose limits on maximum alcohol content, or have other restrictions that prohibit the sale of the 190-proof variant of Everclear, and several of those also effectively prohibit lower-proof Everclear.

In popular culture 
 In the 1991 rap tune "Ever So Clear", Bushwick Bill of the Geto Boys tells the tale of his night drinking Everclear and getting high on PCP earlier that year that resulted in his eye being shot out. A photo of the rapper taken at the hospital after the incident was used on the cover of the Geto Boys album We Can't Be Stopped, on which the track appeared. A version of the track on his 1992 solo album Little Big Man reached number 1 on the U.S. rap charts.
 In the id Software video game series Commander Keen, Everclear is used to fuel the titular character's homemade spaceship. In addition to being a key element of the first installment of the series, the Everclear can be seen on the spaceship in subsequent games.
 The Roger Creager song "The Everclear Song" (written by Mike Ethan Messick and released on the 1998 album Having Fun All Wrong) refers to it.
 The Jerrod Niemann song "For Everclear" on the 2010 album Judge Jerrod & the Hung Jury refers to it.
American rock band Everclear is named for the spirit. "Pure White Evil", a nickname for the drink coined by the band's singer/guitarist Art Alexakis, was the original working title for their album So Much for the Afterglow.
In the HBO series Euphoria, Maddy Perez (played by Alexa Demie), mixes Everclear with Gatorade before heading to the high school winter formal.
In the 2001 film Hedwig and the Angry Inch, Hedwig (played by John Cameron Mitchell) drinks a cocktail consisting of "a little rainwater and Everclear".
In the 2003 movie Freddy vs Jason, the Everclear is used against Jason in the rave party scene, setting him on fire before beginning a killing spree.

See also
 Ethanol (ethyl alcohol, drinking alcohol)
 Liquor
 Denatured alcohol

References

External links 
 

Neutral grain spirits